Donald William Maisey (6 May 1915 – 20 April 2005) was an Australian politician.

Biography
Born in Goomalling, Western Australia, Maisey was educated at Wesley College in Perth before becoming a farmer and grazier at Dowerin.

During the Depression, Maisey became active in organising primary producers and helped form the Farmer's Union of Western Australia in 1947. He was President of the Australian Wheatgrowers' Federation in 1954. In 1963, he was elected to the Australian House of Representatives as the Country Party member for Moore. He held the seat until 1974, when he was defeated by a candidate from the Liberal Party. Maisey died in 2005.

References

Sources
 Whitington, D (1964) The Rulers, Landsdowne Press: Melbourne.

National Party of Australia members of the Parliament of Australia
Members of the Australian House of Representatives for Moore
Members of the Australian House of Representatives
1915 births
2005 deaths
People from Goomalling, Western Australia
20th-century Australian politicians
People educated at Wesley College, Perth